Redis Ltd. (originally Redis Labs, Garantia Data) is a private computer software company headquartered in Mountain View, California. Redis is the sponsor of the open-source in-memory NoSQL database of the same name and the provider of Redis Enterprise software, cloud services, and tools for global companies. The company’s research and development center is based in Tel Aviv and it has additional offices in London, Austin, and Bengaluru.

History 
Redis Ltd was founded under the name Garantia Data in 2011 by Ofer Bengal, previously the founder and CEO of RiT Technologies, and Yiftach Shoolman, previously the founder and president of Crescendo Networks, acquired by F5 Networks. 

In June 2012, the company announced a beta version of its cloud services at GigaOm's Structure LaunchPad. Redis Enterprise Cloud became generally available in February 2013.

In October 2013, Redis acquired MyRedis, a competing hosted Redis provider. On January 29, 2014, the company changed its name from Garantia Data to Redis Labs. 

In early 2015, Redis made available Redis Enterprise Pack. On July 15, 2015, the creator of Redis and lead developer, Salvatore Sanfilippo, joined Redis to lead open source development, and Redis became the official sponsor of the open source project.

In May 2016, the company announced a mechanism for developers to extend Redis, and opened an online marketplace that offers modules certified to work with both open source Redis and Redis' Enterprise products.

In August 2018, the company changed the license of its Redis modules from AGPL to Apache2 modified with Commons Clause. 

In February 2019, the company changed the license of Redis modules to Redis Source Available License (RSAL).

In April 2019 the company acquired RDBTools, a graphical user interface (GUI) to manage Redis from HashedIn. Later in the year the company launched the tool as RedisInsight with expanded capabilities to visualize data in Redis modules.

On August 11, 2021, the company changed its name from Redis Labs to Redis.

The company’s Redis Enterprise platform is presently used by companies such as Capital One, Dick's Sporting Goods, and Kabam.

Funding 
The company secured $4 million in seed funding from angel investors in August 2012, an additional $9 million in series A funding led by Bain Capital Ventures and Carmel Ventures (now known as Viola Ventures), an additional $15m in Series B funding led by the existing investors and Silicon Valley Bank, and an additional $14 million in series C funding led by the same investors. In August 2017 it raised $44 million in series D funding led by Goldman Sachs Private Capital Investing, and in February 2019 $60 million in series E funding led by Francisco Partners with participation by existing investors.
Series F funding was concluded in August 2020 raising another $100 million, with TCV joining as a new investor in the company. Another $110 million was raised in April 2021 and two new investors joined the company as part of Series G round, which was led by Tiger Global, with participation from SoftBank Vision Fund 2. Redis has raised a net amount of $347 million in funding to-date.

Partnerships

References

External links
 

Technology companies established in 2011
Companies based in Santa Clara, California
Cloud computing providers